Abimbola Odejoke (born 14 November 1980) is a Nigerian badminton player. He won the silver medals in the men's doubles and mixed team event, also the bronze medal in mixed doubles event at the 2003 All-Africa Games. Odejoke then claimed the gold medal with the National team at the 2007 All-Africa Games.

Achievements

All-Africa Games 
Men's doubles

Mixed doubles

African Championships 
Men's singles

Men's doubles

Mixed doubles

IBF International 
Men's singles

References

External links 
 
 

1980 births
Living people
Nigerian male badminton players
Badminton players at the 2002 Commonwealth Games
Commonwealth Games competitors for Nigeria
Competitors at the 2003 All-Africa Games
Competitors at the 2007 All-Africa Games
African Games gold medalists for Nigeria
African Games silver medalists for Nigeria
African Games bronze medalists for Nigeria
African Games medalists in badminton
Yoruba sportspeople
21st-century Nigerian people